Khin Than Wai (born 2 November 1995) is a Burmese footballer who plays as a defender for the Myanmar women's national team.

See also
List of Myanmar women's international footballers

References

1995 births
Living people
Women's association football defenders
Burmese women's footballers
People from Mawlamyine
Myanmar women's international footballers